Tylomelania lalemae is a species of freshwater snail with an operculum, an aquatic gastropod mollusk in the family Pachychilidae.

Distribution 
This species occurs in Malili Lakes, Sulawesi, Indonesia.

Ecology 
Tylomelania lalemae is a lacustrine species.

References

lalemae
Gastropods described in 1913